"If I Didn't Love You" is a song written by Tina Arena, Pam Reswick and Steve Werfel, released as the second single released from Arena's third studio album, In Deep (1997), in November 1997. The song reached number 41 on the Australian ARIA Singles Chart. It was later included as track 11 on Arena's 2004 Greatest Hits compilation. This song is written in the key of G.

Track listing
Australian CD single
 "If I Didn't Love You"
 "Any Other Love"
 "Burn" (the T & G Burn the Candle at Both Ends dub remix)

Charts

References

1997 singles
1997 songs
Columbia Records singles
Songs written by Pam Reswick
Songs written by Steve Werfel
Songs written by Tina Arena
Tina Arena songs